This is a list of sovereign states in the 1920s, giving an overview of states around the world during the period between 1 January 1920 and 31 December 1929. It contains entries, arranged alphabetically, with information on the status and recognition of their sovereignty. It includes Widely-recognized sovereign states, and entities which were de facto sovereign but which were not Widely-recognized by other states.

Sovereign states
{|border="0"  cellpadding="0" style="text-align:left; font-size: 95%; border-collapse: collapse; border: 0px solid #AAAAAA;"
|-
!width=60%|Name and capital city
!width=40%|Information on status and recognition of sovereignty 
|-
|colspan=2|

|-
|colspan=3|

 A 
|-
|colspan=2|

|-
|valign=top| Abkhazia – Socialist Soviet Republic of Abkhazia  
Recognized independent state. It was subordinate to the Georgian SSR from December 16, 1921.
|-
|colspan=2|

|-
|valign=top| →  →  →  →  Afghanistan 
 Emirate of Afghanistan 
 Kingdom of Afghanistan 
 Emirate of Afghanistan 
Kingdom of Afghanistan 
Reign of Amanullah Khan, Inayatullah Khan, and Mohammed Nadir Shah: Widely-recognized independent stateReign of Habibullāh Kalakāni, Ali Ahmad Khan and Abd-al Karim: Not recognized by any state.
|-
|colspan=2|

|-
|valign=top| →  →  →  Albania 
 Principality of Albania 
 Albanian Republic 
 Albanian Kingdom 
Widely-recognized independent state. De facto Italian protectorate to August 2, 1920. LON member state from December 17, 1920.
|-
|colspan=2|

|-
|valign=top| Andorra – Principality of Andorra 
Widely-recognized independent state.
|-
|colspan=2|

|-
|valign=top| – Argentine Republic 
Widely-recognized independent state. LON founding member state from January 10, 1920.
|-
|colspan=2|

|-
|valign=top| →  Armenia  
 Republic of Armenia 
 Armenian Socialist Soviet Republic 
Widely-recognized independent state. Became part of the Transcaucasian SFSR from March 12, 1922.
|-
|colspan=2|

|-
|valign=top| Asir – Idrisid Emirate of Asir   
Widely-recognized independent state. Vassal state of Kingdom of Hejaz and Nejd from October 21, 1926.
|-
|colspan=2|

|-
|valign=top| Asir, Upper – Sheikdom of Upper Asir  
Widely-recognized independent state. Partitioned between Sultanate of Nejd and Idrisid Emirate of Asir from August 30, 1920.
|-
|colspan=2|

|-
|valign=top| – Commonwealth of Australia  
Widely-recognized independent state after 15 November, 1926. LON founding member state from 10 January, 1920. Australia had two external territories:
  Norfolk Island
 

Australia administered two League of Nations mandates:
  Nauru 
  New Guinea 
|-
|colspan=2|

|-
|valign=top| Austria – Republic of Austria 
Widely-recognized independent state. LON member state from December 15, 1920.
|-
|colspan=2|

|-
|valign=top| →  →  Azerbaijan  
 Azerbaijan Democratic Republic 
 Azerbaijan Socialist Soviet Republic 
Widely-recognized independent state. Became part of the Transcaucasian SFSR from March 12, 1922. Azerbaijan had one protectorate:
  Nakhichevan ASSR 
|-
|colspan=2|

|-
|colspan=3|

 B 
|-
|colspan=2|

|-
|valign=top| – Kingdom of Belgium 
Widely-recognized independent state. LON founding member state from January 10, 1920. Belgium had sovereignty over one colony and one concession:
  
  Tientsin 

Belgium administered one League of Nations mandate:
  Ruanda-Urundi 
|-
|colspan=2|

|-
|valign=top| – Republic of Bolivia 
Widely-recognized independent state. LON founding member state from January 10, 1920.
|-
|colspan=2|

|-
|valign=top| Brazil – Republic of the United States of Brazil 
Widely-recognized independent state. LON founding member state from January 10, 1920; withdrew in June 14, 1926. Brazil was a federation of 20 states, one territory, and one federal district.
|-
|colspan=2|

|-
|valign=top| – Kingdom of Bulgaria 
Widely-recognized independent state. LON member state from December 16, 1920.
|-
|colspan=2|

|-
|colspan=3|

 C 
|-
|colspan=2|

|-
|valign=top| – Dominion of Canada 
Widely-recognized independent state after November 15, 1926. LON founding member state from January 10, 1920.
|-
|colspan=2|

|-
|valign=top| – Republic of Chile 
Widely-recognized independent state. LON founding member state from January 10, 1920.
|-
|colspan=2|

|-
|valign=top| →  – Republic of China 
Capital: Nanking, Peking, Chungking 
Widely-recognized independent state. LON founding member state from January 10, 1920.
|-
|colspan=2|

|-
|valign=top| – Republic of Colombia 
Widely-recognized independent state. LON founding member state from January 10, 1920.
|-
|colspan=2|

|-
|valign=top| – Republic of Costa Rica 
Widely-recognized independent state. LON member state from December 16, 1920; withdrew in January 22, 1925.
|-
|colspan=2|

|-
|valign=top| – Republic of Cuba 
Widely-recognized independent state. LON founding member state from January 10, 1920.
|-
|colspan=2|

|-
|valign=top| →  Czechoslovakia 
 Czecho-Slovak Republic 
 Czechoslovak Republic 
Widely-recognized independent state. LON founding member state from January 10, 1920.
|-
|colspan=2|

|-
|colspan=3|

 D 
|-
|colspan=2|

|-
|valign=top| – Free City of Danzig  
Widely-recognized independent. Under League of Nations protection.
|-
|colspan=2|

|-
|valign=top| – Kingdom of Denmark 
Widely-recognized independent state. LON founding member state from January 10, 1920.
|-
|colspan=2|

|-
|valign=top| 
Widely-recognized independent state. LON member state from September 28, 1924.
|-
|colspan=2|

|-
|colspan=3|

 E 
|-
|colspan=2|

|-
|valign=top| Ecuador – Republic of Ecuador 
Widely-recognized independent state.
|-
|colspan=2|

|-
|valign=top| – Kingdom of Egypt  
Widely-recognized independent state.
|-
|colspan=2|

|-
|valign=top| – Republic of El Salvador 
Widely-recognized independent state. LON founding member state from January 10, 1920.
|-
|colspan=2|

|-
|valign=top| – Republic of Estonia 
Widely-recognized independent state. LON member state from September 22, 1921.
|-
|colspan=2|

|-
|valign=top| – Ethiopian Empire 
Widely-recognized independent state. LON member state from September 28, 1923.
|-
|colspan=2|

|-
|colspan=3|

 F 
|-
|colspan=2|

|-
|valign=top| – Republic of Finland 
Widely-recognized independent state. LON member state from December 16, 1920.
|-
|colspan=2|

|-
|valign=top| – Free State of Fiume  
Widely-recognized independent. Annexed by Italy from February 22, 1924.
|-
|colspan=2|

|-
|valign=top| France – French Republic 
Widely-recognized independent state. LON founding member state from January 10, 1920. France administered the foreign affairs of the following protectorates:
  French Morocco 

France administered the following League of Nations mandates:
  Alawite 
  Greater Lebanon 
  Syrian Federation 
  State of Syria 
  →  Souaida 
  French Cameroons 
  French Togoland 
  Saar Basin 
|-
|colspan=2|

|-
|colspan=3|

 G 
|-
|colspan=2|

|-
|valign=top| →  →  Georgia 
 Democratic Republic of Georgia 
 Georgian Soviet Socialist Republic 
Widely-recognized independent state. Georgian SSR had one autonomous republic (from July 16, 1921): Adjarian ASSR. Became part of the Transcaucasian SFSR from March 12, 1922.
  SSR Abkhazia 
|-
|colspan=2|

|-
|valign=top| Germany – German Realm 
Widely-recognized independent state. LON member state from September 8, 1926.
|-
|colspan=2|

|-
|valign=top| →  Greece  
 Kingdom of Greece 
 Hellenic Republic 
Widely-recognized independent state. LON founding member state from January 10, 1920.
|-
|colspan=2|

|-
|valign=top| – Republic of Guatemala 
Widely-recognized independent state. LON founding member state from January 10, 1920.
|-
|colspan=2|

|-
|colspan=3|

 H 
|-
|colspan=2|

|-
|valign=top| →  Ha'il / Jabal Shammar – Emirate of Ha'il  
Widely-recognized independent state. It was completely conquered by Saudi forces from November 2, 1921 and subsequently incorporated into the Sultanate of Nejd.
|-
|colspan=2|

|-
|valign=top| – Republic of Haiti 
Widely-recognized independent state. LON founding member state from January 10, 1920.
|-
|colspan=2|

|-
|valign=top| →  – Hashemite Kingdom of Hejaz  
Widely-recognized independent state. Annexed by Sultanate of Nejd, creating the Kingdom of Hejaz and Nejd from January 8, 1926.
|-
|colspan=2|

|-
|valign=top| – Republic of Honduras 
Widely-recognized independent state. LON founding member state from January 10, 1920.
|-
|colspan=2|

|-
|valign=top| →  Hungary 
 Hungarian Republic 
 Kingdom of Hungary 
Widely-recognized independent state. LON member state from September 18, 1922.
|-
|colspan=2|

|-
|colspan=3|

 I 
|-
|colspan=2|

|-
|valign=top| Iceland – Kingdom of Iceland 
Widely-recognized independent state.
|-
|colspan=2|

|-
|valign=top|  – Irish Free State  
Widely-recognized independent state after November 15, 1926. LON member state from September 10, 1923.
|-
|colspan=2|

|-
|valign=top| – Kingdom of Italy 
Widely-recognized independent state. LON founding member state from January 10, 1920. Italy had four colonies and one concession:
  Italian Cyrenaica 
  Italian Eritrea 
  Italian Somaliland 
  Italian Tripolitania 
  Tientsin 
|-
|colspan=2|

|-
|colspan=3|

 J 
|-
|colspan=2|

|-
|valign=top| – Empire of Japan 
Widely-recognized independent state. LON founding member state from January 10, 1920. Japan had sovereignty over the following dependencies and concessions:
  Japanese Korea (Chōsen) 
  Karafuto 
  Kwantung 
  Taiwan 
  Tientsin 

Japan administered one League of Nations mandate:
  South Seas Mandate
|-
|colspan=2|

|-
|colspan=3|

 L 
|-
|colspan=2|

|-
|valign=top| &  Latvia  
  Republic of Latvia
  
Widely-recognized independent state. LON member state from September 22, 1921.
|-
|colspan=2|

|-
|valign=top| – Republic of Liberia 
Widely-recognized independent state. LON founding member state from January 10, 1920.
|-
|colspan=2|

|-
|valign=top| →  – Principality of Liechtenstein 
Widely-recognized independent state.
|-
|colspan=2|

|-
|valign=top| – Republic of Lithuania 
Widely-recognized independent state. LON member state from September 22, 1921.
|-
|colspan=2|

|-
|valign=top| – Grand Duchy of Luxembourg 
Widely-recognized independent state. LON member state from December 16, 1920.
|-
|colspan=2|

|-
|colspan=3|

 M 
|-
|colspan=2|

|-
|valign=top| – United Mexican States 
Widely-recognized independent state.
|-
|colspan=2|

|-
|valign=top| – Principality of Monaco 
Widely-recognized independent state.
|-
|colspan=2|

|-
|valign=top| Mountain Republic - Mountainous Republic of the Northern Caucasus  
Widely-recognized independent state. Incorporated into the Russian SFSR as the Mountain ASSR from January 20, 1921.
|-
|colspan=2|

|-
|valign=top| – Sultanate of Muscat and Oman 
 De jure independent state. De facto a British protectorate.
|-
|colspan=2|

|-
|colspan=3|

 N 
|-
|colspan=2|

|-
|valign=top| →  Nejd   
 Emirate of Nejd and Hasa 
 Sultanate of Nejd 
Widely-recognized independent state. Nejd annexed Hejaz, creating the Kingdom of Hejaz and Nejd from January 8, 1926.
|-
|colspan=2|

|-
|valign=top| Nejd and Hejaz – Kingdom of Nejd and Hejaz 
Capital: Mecca (Hejaz), Riyadh (Nejd)
  Nejd 
 Sultanate of Nejd 
 Kingdom of Nejd and its Dependencies 
  Hejaz – Kingdom of Hejaz 
Widely-recognized independent state. Nejd and Hejaz had one protectorate:
  Asir 
|-
|colspan=2|

|-
|valign=top| Nepal – Kingdom of Nepal  
Widely-recognized independent state.
|-
|colspan=2|

|-
|valign=top| – Kingdom of the Netherlands 
Widely-recognized independent state. LON founding member state from January 10, 1920. The Netherlands had sovereignty over three colonies:
  Curaçao and Dependencies
  Dutch East Indies
  Surinam
|-
|colspan=2|

|-
|valign=top| – Dominion of Newfoundland 
Widely-recognized independent state after November 15, 1926.
|-
|colspan=2|

|-
|valign=top| New Zealand – Dominion of New Zealand 
Widely-recognized independent state after November 15, 1926. LON founding member state from January 10, 1920. The following are territories of New Zealand:
  Cook Islands 
  Niue Island 
  Ross Dependency 
  Union Islands 

New Zealand administered one League of Nations mandate:
  Western Samoa 
|-
|colspan=2|

|-
|valign=top| – Republic of Nicaragua 
Widely-recognized independent state. LON founding member state from January 10, 1920.
|-
|colspan=2|

|-
|valign=top| – Kingdom of Norway 
Widely-recognized independent state. LON founding member state from January 10, 1920. Norway had sovereignty over two uninhabited possessions:
  Bouvet Island 
  Sverdrup Islands
|-
|colspan=3|

 O 
|-
|colspan=2|

|-
|valign=top| – Sublime Ottoman State  
Widely-recognized independent state. Ottoman Empire had one protectorate:
  North Caucasian Emirate 
|-
|colspan=2|

|-
|colspan=3|

 P 
|-
|colspan=2|

|-
|valign=top| – Republic of Panama 
Widely-recognized independent state.
|-
|colspan=2|

|-
|valign=top| – Republic of Paraguay 
Widely-recognized independent state. LON founding member state from January 10, 1920.
|-
|colspan=2|

|-
|valign=top| →  Persia 
 Persian Empire 
 Imperial State of Persia 
Widely-recognized independent state. LON founding member state from January 10, 1920.
|-
|colspan=2|

|-
|valign=top| – Peruvian Republic 
Widely-recognized independent state. LON founding member state from January 10, 1920.
|-
|colspan=2|

|-
|valign=top| →  Poland – Republic of Poland 
Widely-recognized independent state. LON founding member state from January 10, 1920.
|-
|colspan=2|

|-
|valign=top| – Portuguese Republic 
Widely-recognized independent state. LON founding member state from January 10, 1920. The following are colonies and possession of Portugal:
  
  Portuguese Macau 
  Portuguese East Africa 
  
  Portuguese India 
  
  Portuguese West Africa 
  Fort of São João Baptista de Ajudá 
  Portuguese São Tomé and Príncipe 
|-
|colspan=2|

|-
|colspan=3|

 R 
|-
|colspan=2|

|-
|valign=top| – Kingdom of Romania 
Widely-recognized independent state. LON founding member state from January 10, 1920.
|-
|colspan=2|

|-
|valign=top| – Russian Socialist Federative Soviet Republic  
Widely-recognized independent state. Became part of the Soviet Union from December 30, 1922. Russia had three protectorates and one concession:
  Bukhara 
  Khiva 
  Uryankhay 
  Tientsin 
|-
|colspan=2|

|-
|colspan=3|

 S 
|-
|colspan=2|

|-
|valign=top| – Most Serene Republic of San Marino 
Widely-recognized independent state.
|-
|colspan=2|

|-
|valign=top| Serbs, Croats and Slovenes / Yugoslavia 
 Kingdom of Serbs, Croats, and Slovenes 
 Kingdom of Yugoslavia 
Widely-recognized independent state. LON founding member state from January 10, 1920.
|-
|colspan=2|

|-
|valign=top| Siam – Kingdom of Siam 
Widely-recognized independent state. LON founding member state from January 10, 1920.
|-
|colspan=2|

|-
|valign=top| →  – Union of South Africa 
Capital: Cape Town, Pretoria, Bloemfontein, and Pietermaritzburg 
Widely-recognized independent state after November 15, 1926. LON founding member state from January 10, 1920. South Africa administered one League of Nations mandate:
  →  South West Africa 
|-
|colspan=2|

|-
|valign=top| →  →  – Union of Soviet Socialist Republics  
Widely-recognized independent state. The Soviet Union was a federation of four (later seven) republics.
|-
|colspan=2|

|-
|valign=top| Spain – Kingdom of Spain 
Widely-recognized independent state. LON founding member state from January 10, 1920. Spain had sovereignty over the following colonies, possessions and protectorate:
  Elobey, Annobón and Corisco 
  Fernando Poo 
  Río Muni 
  
  Spanish North Africa 
  
  Spanish Morocco 
|-
|colspan=2|

|-
|valign=top| – Kingdom of Sweden 
Widely-recognized independent state. LON founding member state from January 10, 1920.
|-
|colspan=2|

|-
|valign=top| – Swiss Confederation 
Widely-recognized independent state. LON founding member state from January 10, 1920.
|-
|colspan=2|

|-
|colspan=3|

 T 
|-
|colspan=2|

|-
|valign=top| Tibet 
 De facto independent state. Claimed by the Republic of China.
|-
|colspan=2|

|-
|valign=top| – Transcaucasian Socialist Federative Soviet Republic  
Widely-recognized independent state. The Transcaucasian SFSR was a federation constituted by the Armenian SSR, the Azerbaijan SSR and the Georgian SSR. Became part of the Soviet Union from December 30, 1922.
|-
|colspan=2|

|-
|valign=top|  
 Turkey 
 Republic of Turkey 

Widely-recognized independent state.
|-
|colspan=2|

|-
|colspan=3|

 U 
|-
|colspan=2|

|-
|valign=top| 
 United Kingdom of Great Britain and Ireland 
 United Kingdom of Great Britain and Northern Ireland 
Widely-recognized independent state. LON founding member state from January 10, 1920. The following were colonies, and territories of the United Kingdom:
  
  Bahrain – State of Bahrain 
  Baker Island 
  
  Basutoland – Territory of Basutoland 
  Bechuanaland – Bechuanaland Protectorate 
  Bermuda 
  Bhutan – Kingdom of Bhutan 
  
  
  
  British Leeward Islands – Federal Colony of the Leeward Islands 
  – British Somaliland Protectorate 
  British Western Pacific Territories 
  British Windward Islands – Federal Colony of the Windward Islands 
  Brunei – State of Brunei 
  
  Cyprus 
  Falkland Islands 
  Federated Malay States 
  Fiji 
  Gambia – Gambia Colony and Protectorate 
  
  
  Guernsey – Bailiwick of Guernsey 
  Heard Island and McDonald Islands 
  Hong Kong 
  
  Isle of Man 
  Jamaica 
  Kenya 
  Jarvis Island 
  – Bailiwick of Jersey 
  Kuwait – Sheikhdom of Kuwait 
  Maldive Islands – Sultanate of the Maldive Islands 
  Malta 
  Mauritius 
  Nepal 
  Nigeria – Colony and Protectorate of Nigeria 
  
  Northern Rhodesia – Protectorate of Northern Rhodesia 
  – Nyasaland Protectorate 
  Qatar – State of Qatar 
  Saint Helena 
  Sarawak – Kingdom of Sarawak 
  Seychelles 
  Sierra Leone – Sierra Leone Colony and Protectorate 
  – Colony of Southern Rhodesia 
  
  Swaziland – Swaziland Protectorate 
  Transjordan 
  
  Tristan da Cunha 
  Trucial States 
  Uganda 
 Unfederated Malay States
  Johor 
  Kedah 
  →  Kelantan 
  
  
  Victoria Land 
  Weihaiwei 
  Zanzibar 

United Kingdom administered the following League of Nations mandates:
  British Cameroons 
  British Togoland 
  →  Iraq 
  Palestine 
  →  Transjordan 
  Saar Basin 
  
|-
|colspan=2|

|-
|valign=top| – United States of America 
Widely-recognized independent state. The following were territories of the United States of America:
  Alaska 
  American Samoa 
  Corn Islands 
  Guam 
  Hawaii 
  Howland Island 
  Johnston Atoll 
  Kingman Reef 
  Midway Atoll 
  Navassa Island 
  
  Petrel Islands 
  Philippine Islands 
  Puerto Rico 
  Quita Sueno Bank 
  Roncador Bank 
  Serrana Bank 
  Serranilla Bank 
  Swan Islands 
  
|-
|colspan=2|

|-
|valign=top| – Eastern Republic of Uruguay 
Widely-recognized independent state. LON founding member state from January 10, 1920.
|-
|colspan=2|

|-
|colspan=3|

 V 
|-
|colspan=2|

|-
|valign=top| – Vatican City State  
Widely recognized independent state. Vatican City is administered by the Holy See.
|-
|colspan=2|

|-
|valign=top| – United States of Venezuela 
Widely-recognized independent state. LON founding member state from January 10, 1920.
|-
|colspan=2|

|-
|colspan=3|

 Y 
|-
|colspan=2|

|-
|valign=top| Yemen – Mutawakkilite Kingdom of Yemen 
Widely-recognized independent state.
|-
|colspan=2|

States claiming sovereignty
|-
|valign=top| Alash – Alash Autonomy  
Unrecognized state.
|-
|colspan=2|

|-
|valign=top| Ararat – Republic of Ararat  
Unrecognized state.
|-
|colspan=2|

|-
|valign=top| Armenia, Mountainous  
Unrecognized state.
|-
|colspan=2|

|-
|valign=top| Azadistan  
Unrecognized state.
|-
|colspan=2|

|-
|valign=top| Baranya–Baja – Serbian–Hungarian Baranya–Baja Republic  
Unrecognized state.
|-
|colspan=2|

|-
|valign=top| Bottleneck – Free State of Bottleneck  
Quasi-state. Unoccupied territory within post-World War I Germany.
|-
|colspan=2|

|-
|valign=top| Bukhara  
 Bukharan People's Soviet Republic 
 Bukharan Socialist Soviet Republic 
Soviet state.
|-
|colspan=2|

|-
|valign=top| Byelorussia – Byelorussian Socialist Soviet Republic  
Soviet state. Became part of the Soviet Union from December 30, 1922.
|-
|colspan=2|

|-
|valign=top| Carnaro – Italian Regency of Carnaro  
Unrecognized state.
|-
|colspan=2|

|-
|valign=top| Central Lithuania – Republic of Central Lithuania  
Puppet state of the Second Polish Republic.
|-
|colspan=2|

|-
|valign=top| Don – Don Republic  
Unrecognized state.
|-
|colspan=2|

|-
|valign=top|  
Puppet state/Buffer state of Soviet Russia.
|-
|colspan=2|

|-
|valign=top| Galicia – Galician Socialist Soviet Republic  
Unrecognized state.
|-
|colspan=2|

|-
|valign=top| Gilan – Persian Socialist Soviet Republic  
Unrecognized state.
|-
|colspan=2|

|-
|valign=top| Ireland – Irish Republic  
Unrecognized state.
|-
|colspan=2|

|-
|valign=top| Karelia
 Karelian United Government 
 Republic of Eastern Karelia 
Unrecognized state.
|-
|colspan=2|

|-
|valign=top| Khorasan – Autonomous Government of Khorasan  
Unrecognized state.
|-
|colspan=2|

|-
|valign=top| Khorezm  
 Khorezm People's Soviet Republic 
 Khorezm Socialist Soviet Republic 
Soviet state.
|-
|colspan=2|

|-
|valign=top| Korea, Provisional Government of – Provisional Government of the Republic of Korea 
 Partially recognized Korean government-in-exile.
|-
|colspan=2|

|-
|valign=top| – Kuban People's Republic  
Unrecognized state.
|-
|colspan=2|

|-
|valign=top| Kurdistan – Kingdom of Kurdistan  
Unrecognized state.
|-
|colspan=2|

|-
|valign=top| – Labin Republic  
Unrecognized state.
|-
|colspan=2|

|-
|valign=top| Leitha – Banate of Leitha  
Unrecognized state.
|-
|colspan=2|

|-
|valign=top| Lemko Republic – Lemko-Rusyn People's Republic  
Unrecognized state.
|-
|colspan=2|

|-
|valign=top| Mirdita – Republic of Mirdita  
Unrecognized state.
|-
|colspan=2|

|-
|valign=top| →  →  Mongolia  Capital: Niislel Khüree (renamed Ulaanbaatar in 1924)
 Bogd Khanate of Mongolia 
 Mongolian People's Government 
 Mongolian People's Republic 
Partially recognized socialist republic. Under Soviet intervention from 1921 to 1924. Satellite state of the Soviet Union from November 26, 1924.

|-
|colspan=2|

|-
|valign=top| North Ingria – Republic of North Ingria  
Unrecognized state.
|-
|colspan=2|

|-
|valign=top| Rhineland – Rhenish Republic  
Unrecognized state.
|-
|colspan=2|

|-
|valign=top| Rif – Confederal Republic of the Tribes of the Rif  
Unrecognized state.
|-
|colspan=2|

|-
|valign=top| Southern Karelia – Olonets Government of Southern Karelia 
Unrecognized state.
|-
|colspan=2|

|-
|valign=top| Syria – Arab Kingdom of Syria  
 De facto'' independent state not recognized by any other state.
|-
|colspan=2|

|-
|valign=top| →  Tannu Tuva  
 People's Republic of Tannu Tuva 
 Tuvan People's Republic 
Partially recognized socialist republic. Satellite state of the Soviet Union.
|-
|colspan=2|

|-
|valign=top| Uhtua – Republic of Uhtua  
Unrecognized state.
|-
|colspan=2|

|-
|valign=top| Ukraine, Soviet – Ukrainian  Socialist Soviet Republic  
Soviet proto-state. Became part of the Soviet Union from December 30, 1922.
|-
|colspan=2|

|-
|colspan=3|

Notes

References

1920-1929
1920s politics-related lists